Zhao Long (born September 1967) is a Chinese politician who is the current governor of Fujian, in office since 22 October 2021.

Biography
Zhao was born in Panjin, Liaoning, in September 1967. He joined the Chinese Communist Party in December 1988. After graduating from the Renmin University of China in 1989, he was despatched to the National Land Administration, which was reshuffled as the Ministry of Land and Resources in 1998 and Ministry of Natural Resources in 2018. He moved up the ranks to become vice minister in June 2016, a position at vice-ministerial level.

In July 2020, he was appointed vice governor of southeast China's Fujian province and was admitted to member of the standing committee of the CPC Fujian Provincial Committee, the province's top authority.
In January 2021, he took office as party secretary of Xiamen, replacing Hu Changsheng, who was promoted to governor of Heilongjiang.
On 22 October, he rose to become the acting governor of Fujian, becoming the youngest head of provincial administrative region government in China. On 25 January 2022, he was elected as the governor of Fujian.

References

1967 births
Living people
People from Panjin
Renmin University of China alumni
Peking University alumni
People's Republic of China politicians from Liaoning
Chinese Communist Party politicians from Liaoning
Governors of Fujian